(), also referred as the Official hats of the Qing dynasty, Qing official headwear, and Mandarin hat in English, is a generic term which refers to the types of , a headgear, worn by the officials of the Qing dynasty in China. The  typically forms of part of the  system as opposed to the  system and were completely different from the types of  used in the previous dynasties.

Types of

() was a type of daily hat worn by the officials of the Qing dynasty; however, it actually dated from the late Ming dynasty and was popular from the late Ming to the end of the Republic of China period. The  was mostly black in colour and was made of 6 separate pieces and was therefore also called the "six-in-one hat"; it was made out of gauze in summer and autumn while damask was used in spring and winter seasons. The inside of the hat however was red in colour; there was a knot on the top of the hat which was typically made of red threads. When worn by common people, the knot is however black in colour and when there are funerals, the knot is white in colour.

() was the official hat worn by civil officials in the Qing dynasty during the winter seasons.

Construction and design 

It consisted of a black velvet cap in winter, or a hat woven in rattan or similar materials in summer, both with a button on the top. The button or knob would become a finial during formal court ceremonies held by the Emperor.

Jewelries and accessories 
Officials would have to change their tops on the hat, for non-formal ceremonies or daily businesses. Red silk tassels extended down from the finial to cover the hat, and a large peacock feather (with one to three "eyes") could be attached to the back of the hat, should the merit of wearing it have been granted by the emperor.

The colour and shape of the finial depended on the wearer's grade:

 The royalty and nobility used various numbers of pearls. 
 An officer of the first grade wore a translucent red ball (originally ruby); second grade, solid red ball (originally coral); third grade, translucent blue ball (originally sapphire); fourth grade, solid blue ball; fifth grade, translucent white ball (originally crystal); sixth grade, solid white ball (originally mother of pearl). Officers of the seventh to ninth grade wore gold or clear amber balls of varied designs.

See also

List of headgear
Song official headwear
Tang official headwear

Notes

References 

Chinese headgear
Insignia
Qing clothing